Lucy Hope (née Graham; born 10 October 1996) is a Scottish footballer who plays as a midfielder for Everton in the FA WSL and the Scotland national team. She has previously played for Forfar Farmington and Hibernian in Scotland, Mallbackens in Sweden and Bristol City in England.

Club career

Forfar Farmington (2012–2013) and Hibernian (2013–2015) 

Hope began her senior career at Forfar Farmington in 2012. In her first season, she helped the club finish second in the SWPL and reach the Scottish Women's Cup final. Her performances earned her a nomination for the Players' Player of the Year award.

In the summer of 2013, she left Forfar Farmington to join Hibernian.

Mallbackens (2015) 

In July 2015, Hope left Hibernian to join Swedish club Mallbackens.

Return to Hibernian (2016–2018) 
In January 2016, Hope returned to Hibernian. On 5 October 2016, she made her UEFA Women's Champions League debut in a 6–0 loss to Bayern Munich. She played a crucial role in Hibernian's 2017–18 UEFA Women's Champions League campaign, scoring four goals in three matches.

Bristol City (2018–2019) 

Hope joined Bristol City in July 2018. On 19 August 2018, she scored twice in her debut against Leicester City in the FA WSL Cup. On 9 September 2018, she made her league debut and scored the winning goal in a 1–0 victory against Brighton & Hove Albion. She ended the campaign as the team's leading goalscorer with seven league goals and twelve in all competitions. In May 2019, it was announced Hope was to leave Bristol after just one season.

Everton (2019–) 
On 4 July 2019, Everton announced they had signed Hope to a two-year deal.

International career 

Hope was included in the Scotland squad for a friendly match with Belgium in April 2017. On 14 September 2017, she made her full international debut in a 3–0 win over Hungary.

Honours

Hibernian
Winner
 Scottish Women's Cup (2): 2016, 2017
 Scottish Women's Premier League Cup  (2): 2016, 2017

Runner-up
 Scottish Women's Premier League: 2013
 Scottish Women's Cup: 2013
 Scottish Women's Premier League Cup  (2): 2014, 2015

Forfar Farmington

Runner-up
 Scottish Women's Premier League: 2012
 Scottish Women's Cup: 2012

Personal life
Hope was known as Lucy Graham until getting married in December 2022.

References

External links 
 
 Lucy Hope at evertonfc.com
 Lucy Graham at scottishfa.co.uk

1996 births
Living people
Scottish women's footballers
Hibernian W.F.C. players
Mallbackens IF players
Damallsvenskan players
Scottish expatriate women's footballers
Scottish expatriate sportspeople in Sweden
Expatriate women's footballers in Sweden
Women's association football midfielders
Scotland women's international footballers
Bristol City W.F.C. players
Forfar Farmington F.C. players
Everton F.C. (women) players